Abdullah I bin Sabah Al-Sabah (Abdullah I; 1740 – 3 May 1814) was the second ruler of the Sheikhdom of Kuwait, ruling from 10 January 1762 to 3 May 1814. He was the youngest son of Sabah bin Jaber, upon whose death he succeeded. He is also the father of Jaber I Al-Sabah who succeeded him.

References

18th-century people from the Ottoman Empire
19th-century people from the Ottoman Empire
18th-century Kuwaiti people
19th-century Kuwaiti people
1740 births
1814 deaths
Rulers of Kuwait
House of Al-Sabah
18th-century Arabs